Masur is a surname signifying membership in the Masurians ethnic group. Related surnames include "Mazur" and "Mazurek".

 Andy Masur (born 1967), American sportscaster
 Daniel Masur (born 1994), German tennis player
 David Masur (born 1962), American soccer player
 Harold Q. Masur (1909–2005), American author
 Howard Masur, American mathematician
 Jonathan Masur, American legal scholar
 Kate Masur (active 2022), American author
 Ken-David Masur (born 1977), German conductor
 Kurt Masur (1927–2015), German conductor
 Louis Masur (born 1957), American historian
 Norbert Masur (1901–1971), Swedish representative to the World Jewish Congress
 Richard Masur (born 1948), American actor
 Wally Masur (born 1963), Australian tennis player

See also
 

German-language surnames
Slavic-language surnames
East Slavic-language surnames
Polish-language surnames
Jewish surnames
Surnames of Polish origin
Ethnonymic surnames